The University of Montenegro Faculty of Economics (Montenegrin: Ekonomski fakultet Univerziteta Crne Gore Економски факултет Универзитета Црне Горе) is one of the educational institutions of the University of Montenegro. The building is located in Podgorica, next to the Faculty of Law and the Faculty of Political Sciences building. The Podgorica School of Economics is Montenegro's leading educational institution in business end economics.

History 

The Faculty of Economics was founded in 1960, and is the oldest institution of higher education in Montenegro. It was a part of the University of Belgrade until April 29, 1974, when the Agreement on Association into the University of Titograd (today's University of Montenegro) was signed with the representatives of the Faculty of Law, the Faculty of Engineering, the Teaching College from Nikšić, the Maritime Studies College from Kotor and three independent scientific institutes from Titograd.

Degree programs

Undergraduate program 

The curriculum of undergraduate studies at the Faculty comprises eight courses:
 Entrepreneurship and Business
 Finances
 Management
 International Business
 Marketing
 Quantitative Methods in Economics
 Information Systems
 Economy of Public Administration

Postgraduate programs 

The curriculum of postgraduate studies at the Faculty comprises only one course: Entrepreneurial Economy.

Alumni 

Some of the school's renowned students and professors include:
 Igor Lukšić, PhD -  current Prime Minister of Montenegro
 Milo Đukanović - former Prime Minister and President of Montenegro
 Momir Bulatović - former President of Montenegro and Prime Minister of the Federal Republic of Yugoslavia
 Gordana Đurović, PhD - former Minister of European Integrations of Montenegro
 Vujica Lazović - Minister of Information Society and Telecommunications of Montenegro
 Predrag Sekulić - current Minister of Sustainable Development and Tourism of Montenegro
 Milorad Katnić, PhD - current Minister of Finance of Montenegro

References 

Economics
Economics schools
Montenegro
Economics
Business schools in Montenegro
1960 establishments in Yugoslavia